Cameraria betulivora is a moth of the family Gracillariidae. It is known from Ontario and Quebec in Canada and the United States (including Maine and North Carolina).

The wingspan is about 7 mm.

The larvae feed on Betula species, including Betula alleghaniensis, Betula lenta, Betula lutea, Betula papyrifera and Betula populifolia. They mine the leaves of their host plant. The mine has the form of a small, sometimes almost circular, blotch upon the upper side of the leaf.

References

betulivora
Leaf miners

Moths described in 1891
Lepidoptera of Canada
Lepidoptera of the United States
Moths of North America
Taxa named by Thomas de Grey, 6th Baron Walsingham